John Edward Nutting Jr. (February 8, 1939 – May 20, 2022) was an American football offensive tackle in the National Football League (NFL) for the Dallas Cowboys and the Cleveland Browns. He played college football at Georgia Tech.

Early years
Nutting attended Northside High School before moving on to Georgia Tech, where he was a two-way tackle. He was a member of the Sigma Nu Fraternity, and also set an SEC shot put record in 1960.

He left school before his college eligibility was over, in order to join the NFL.

Professional career

Cleveland Browns
Nutting was selected in the second round (27th overall) of the 1961 NFL Draft by the Cleveland Browns. He was also drafted in the 15th round (114th overall) of the 1961 AFL Draft by the Dallas Texans. On June 19, 1961, signed a professional contract with the Cleveland Browns.

As a rookie, he suffered a knee injury in the fourth game of the season against the Washington Redskins and was placed on the injured reserve list. On July 22, 1962, he was traded to the Dallas Cowboys in exchange for fullback Merrill Douglas.

Dallas Cowboys
On July 30, 1962, he suffered a serious right knee injury and was lost for the season after being placed on the injured reserve list. The next year, he started the first seven games at right tackle, until losing his spot to Bob Fry, who was moved to the right side to allow Tony Liscio to start at left tackle. In 1964, he announced his retirement to devote more time to his advertising business.

Personal Life

Nutting married Forrest Armstrong and had two children, a daughter Forrest and a son, Bradford, as well as grandchildren, Madeline, Conner, Darby, and Savannah.  He was married to his wife for 51 years. He was a member of Sigma Nu Fraternity. He attended the Woodrow Wilson School of Law and passed the Georgia Bar. He had a long career in commercial real estate. He received the Silver Phoenix Award through the Atlanta Board of Realtors.

References

1939 births
Living people
Players of American football from Atlanta
American football offensive tackles
American male shot putters
Georgia Tech Yellow Jackets football players
Georgia Tech Yellow Jackets men's track and field athletes
Cleveland Browns players
Dallas Cowboys players